Edward Darmanin (born 15 November 1945 in Malta) is a former professional footballer who is the head coach of Xaghjra Tornados Youth Nursery.

During his career, Darmanin played as a defender for St. George's, Hibernians, Sliema Wanderers and Qormi. Darmanin made 28 appearances for the Malta national football team.

Honours

Sliema Wanderers
Winner as a Player
 1965–66, 1970–71, 1971–72, 1975–76 Maltese Premier League
 1971–72 Maltese Player of the Year
 1967–68, 1968–69, 1973-74 Cup Winner
 1969–70, 1971–72, 1973-74 Independence Cup
 1965–66, Scicluna Cup
 1966–67, 1967–68, 1970-71 Christmas Cup
 1966–67 Cassar Cup
 1975–76 Sportswriters Footballer of the year

St. Patrick F.C.
Winner as a coach
1980–85,3 Promotions from 3rd Division to Premier
1994–95,1 Promotion from 1st Division to Premier

Xghajra T.F.C
Winner as a coach
1996–97,1 Promotion from 1st Division to Premier

St. George's
Winner as a coach
2003–04 Promotion from 2nd Division to 1st Division

B'Bugia St.Peter's
Winner as a coach
2005–06 Promotion from 3rd Division to 2nd Division

References

External links
 Edward Darmanin at QormiFC.com
 

Living people
1945 births
Maltese footballers
Malta international footballers
St. George's F.C. players
Hibernians F.C. players
Sliema Wanderers F.C. players
Qormi F.C. players
Mqabba F.C. players
Maltese football managers
Association football defenders